The 1938 United States elections were held on November 8, 1938, in the middle of Democratic President Franklin D. Roosevelt's second term. The Democratic Party lost 72 seats, mostly to the Republican Party, in the House of Representatives. The Democrats also lost eight seats to the Republicans in the U.S. Senate. 

The election was a defeat for Roosevelt, as the conservative coalition (an alliance of Republicans and Southern Democrats) took control of Congress and stymied Roosevelt's domestic agenda. Roosevelt had campaigned openly against members of his own party who had not supported the New Deal, but Roosevelt's preferred candidates met with little success across the country. The election took place in the aftermath of the recession of 1937–38 and the defeat of the Judicial Procedures Reform Bill of 1937 ("the court-packing plan"), and President Roosevelt was at the nadir of his popularity. Republicans picked up Congressional seats for the first time since the start of the Great Depression, and few new major domestic programs became law until the advent of the Great Society in the 1960s.

See also
1938 United States House of Representatives elections
1938 United States Senate elections
1938 United States gubernatorial elections

References

Further reading
 Carson, Jamie L. "Electoral and Partisan Forces in the Roosevelt Era: The US Congressional Elections of 1938." Congress & the Presidency 28#2 (2001) 161–183 https://doi.org/10.1080/07343460109507751
  (Excerpt and text search)
 
 
  (Excerpt and text search); also in JSTOR

 
1938
United States midterm elections
November 1938 events